Lyudmila Valeryevna Bodniyeva (born on October 15, 1978 in Elista, Russia) is the current head coach of the Russian women's national handball team. She formerly played for the clubs Akva Volgograd and Krim Ljubljana, and was a world champion with the Russian women's national handball team. She is of Kalmyk ethnicity.

She won a gold medal with the winning Russian team at the 2005 World Women's Handball Championship in Saint Petersburg, Russia, and was selected into the championship's all-star team (as pivot).

She received a silver medal at the 2006 European Women's Handball Championship in Sweden, and was voted into the all-star team (pivot). She was also in the all-star team at the 2004 European Women's Handball Championship, where the Russian team finished 4th.
 
Twice World Champion, silver and bronze medalist of Europe Championship
"All star team" as pivot: 
World Championship 2001 Italy, 2005 Russia (MVP) 
European Championship 2000 Romania, 2002 Danmark, 2004 Hungaria, 2006 Sweden

References

External links

Russian female handball players
1978 births
Living people
Luidmila
People from Elista
Handball players at the 2012 Summer Olympics
Olympic handball players of Russia
Handball coaches of international teams
Sportspeople from Kalmykia